Eucalyptus semota, commonly known as marymia mallee, is a species of mallee or small tree that is endemic to a small area in central Western Australia. It has rough, flaky to fibrous bark on the trunk, smooth grey or brown bark above, linear to narrow lance-shaped leaves, flower buds in groups of seven or nine, white flowers and conical to cup-shaped fruit.

Description
It has rough, flaky to fibrous, grey to black bark on some or all of the trunk, smooth grey to brown bark above.

Taxonomy and naming
Eucalyptus semota was first described in 1996 by Carol J. Macpherson and Peter M. Grayling from specimens collected by Macpherson near Marymia Hill north east of Kumarina. The specific epithet (semota) is from the Latin word semotus meaning "remote", referring to the geographic isolation of this species from its near relatives in the series Loxophlebae.

Distribution and habitat
Marymia mallee is known from three separate population between Marymia Hill and Kumarina where it grows in clay soils in gullies.

Conservation status
This eucalypt is classified as "Priority One" by the Government of Western Australia Department of Parks and Wildlife, meaning that it is known from only one or a few locations which are potentially at risk.

See also
 List of Eucalyptus species

References

Eucalypts of Western Australia
semota
Myrtales of Australia
Plants described in 1996